Phil Ochs in Concert is Phil Ochs' third long player, released in 1966 on Elektra Records. Despite its title, it was not entirely live, as several tracks were actually recorded in the studio, owing to flaws in the live recordings made in Boston and New York City in late 1965 and early 1966. The album's producers retained the essence of a live album by including song patter and audience reactions between and during the songs. Phil Ochs in Concert features many of the folksinger's most enduring songs and represents the culmination of Ochs' folk career, the last of his original albums to be all-acoustic.

Songs
"There but for Fortune", which opens side two of the LP, is perhaps the best-known track. A minor hit for Joan Baez (whom Ochs jokingly credits with its authoring), this song encourages people to count themselves as fortunate, as fate takes its toll on those with broken lives who might have turned out differently under other circumstances, and makes the point that negative things can happen to anyone.

Perhaps the second most known track, "Love Me, I'm a Liberal", is a sarcastic take on the fair-weather politics of mainstream American liberals. It has been covered (often with updated lyrics) many times since its initial release.

The album features one of Ochs' few love songs, "Changes", an image-filled, impressionistic ballad lamenting the loss of his life with someone he loves. "Bracero" is a scathing attack on the plight of migrant workers who cross the border from Mexico to work for a pittance.  "Canons of Christianity" attacks the hypocrisy of church teachings and leaders. "Cops of the World" paints a portrait of America as invaders who want to impose their values and ways of life on the world, doing anything they please, expecting everybody else to comply. "Santo Domingo" depicts the 1965-66 U.S. occupation of the Dominican Republic as a ruthless imperialist adventure. "Ringing of Revolution" presents a utopian vision of proletarian conquest and marks one of the earliest recorded political references to Ronald Reagan in music.

The album opener, "I'm Going to Say It Now", is in the voice of an idealistic college student towards the adults running the school, forcefully but respectfully asserting his right to speak his mind. The final song on the album, "When I'm Gone," is a prescient, sad ode to the shortness of life and the pressing need to fight for social justice while you can.

Track listing
All songs written by Phil Ochs.

Side one
"I'm Going to Say It Now" – 2:46
"Bracero" – 3:57
"Ringing of Revolution" – 5:30
"Is There Anybody Here?" – 3:17
"Canons of Christianity" – 4:22

Side two
"There but for Fortune" – 2:35
"Cops of the World" – 4:45
"Santo Domingo" – 3:48
"Changes" – 4:30
"Love Me, I'm a Liberal" – 3:46
"When I'm Gone" – 3:51

Personnel
According to the LP's liner notes, except where noted:

Phil Ochs vocals, guitar

Production
Mark Abramson producer
Jac Holzman producer
David B. Jones engineer

Additional personnel
Joel Brodsky photography (liner photo)
William S. Harvey art direction (cover design)
Dan Kramer photography

See also
Ronald Reagan in music

References

Albums produced by Jac Holzman
Albums produced by Mark Abramson
Phil Ochs live albums
1966 live albums
Elektra Records live albums